The São Francisco sparrow (Arremon franciscanus) is a species of bird in the family Passerellidae that is endemic to Brazil. The species was described in 1997 by Marcos Raposo in his book Ararajuba. The species feeds on caatinga and is found in the valley of Rio São Francisco and in the states such as Bahia and Minas Gerais. Unlike its cousins the pectoral and half-collared sparrows, the São Francisco sparrow has a full breast band, which later reduces itself to two breast patches closer to the wing bend. The species also has other distinguishing features of orange bill and black culmen. They are threatened due to habitat loss.

References

Birds of Brazil
Arremon
Endemic birds of Brazil
Taxonomy articles created by Polbot